Kiskunfélegyháza is a district in eastern part of Bács-Kiskun County. Kiskunfélegyháza is also the name of the town where the district seat is found. The district is located in the Southern Great Plain Statistical Region.

Geography 
Kiskunfélegyháza District borders with Kecskemét District and Tiszakécske District to the north, Csongrád District (Csongrád County) to the east, Kistelek District (Csongrád County) and Kiskunmajsa District to the south, Kiskőrös District to the west. The number of the inhabited places in Kiskunfélegyháza District is 6.

Municipalities 
The district has 1 town, 1 large village and 4 villages.
(ordered by population, as of 1 January 2012)

The bolded municipality is city, italics municipality is large village.

Demographics

In 2011, it had a population of 37,455 and the population density was 64/km².

Ethnicity
Besides the Hungarian majority, the main minorities are the Roma (approx. 300), German (200) and Romanian (100).

Total population (2011 census): 37,455
Ethnic groups (2011 census): Identified themselves: 33,240 persons:
Hungarians: 32,326 (97.25%)
Others and indefinable: 914 (2.75%)
Approx. 4,000 persons in Kiskunfélegyháza District did not declare their ethnic group at the 2011 census.

Religion
Religious adherence in the county according to 2011 census:

Catholic – 22,542 (Roman Catholic – 22,464; Greek Catholic – 72);
Reformed – 899;
Evangelical – 74;
other religions – 349; 
Non-religious – 3,512; 
Atheism – 276;
Undeclared – 9,803.

Gallery

See also
List of cities and towns of Hungary

References

External links
 Postal codes of the Kiskunfélegyháza District

Districts in Bács-Kiskun County